Camp Hill is a town in Tallapoosa County, Alabama, United States. It was incorporated in 1895. At the 2010 census the population was 1,014, down from 1,273 in 2000. Camp Hill is the home to Southern Preparatory Academy (formerly known as "Lyman Ward Military Academy").

History

On July 15, 1931, a white mob, led by Tallapoosa County sheriff Kyle Young and Camp Hill police chief J. M. Wilson—who voiced his desire to “kill every member of the ‘Reds’ there and throw them into the creek,” raided a meeting of the Alabama Sharecroppers' Union which was being held in a church in Camp Hill.  A shootout between the mob and union members followed; SCU member Ralph Gray was murdered, his home burned, and his burned corpse was dumped on the courthouse steps. Dozens of black men and women were killed, lynched or injured, and at least thirty sharecroppers were later arrested. According to Hosea Hudson, all those arrested were eventually released without trial due to public and international pressure—albeit too late to have a chance at raising a crop that year.

Geography
Camp Hill is located at  (32.799285, -85.652902).

The town is located in the east central part of the state along U.S. Route 280 and Alabama State Route 50. U.S. 280 runs along the southwestern
boundary of the town, leading southeast 21 mi (34 km) to Opelika; northwest 8 mi (13 km) to Dadeville, the
Tallapoosa County seat; and 21 mi (34 km) northwest to Alexander City, the largest city in Tallapoosa County. AL-50 runs through the center of town, leading northeast 18 mi (29 km) to LaFayette, the county seat of Chambers County, and southwest 24 mi (39 km) to the unincorporated community of Red Hill in Elmore County. Birmingham is 92 mi (148 km) northwest via U.S. 280.

Demographics

2000 census
At the 2000 census there were 1,273 people, 519 households, and 337 families in the town. The racial makeup of the town was 84.92% Black or African American, 14.38% White, 0.31% from other races, and 0.39% from two or more races. 1.02% of the population were Hispanic or Latino of any race.
Of the 519 households 30.3% had children under the age of 18 living with them, 29.5% were married couples living together, 30.1% had a female householder with no husband present, and 34.9% were non-families. 33.3% of households were one person and 12.7% were one person aged 65 or older. The average household size was 2.45 and the average family size was 3.09.

The age distribution was 29.4% under the age of 18, 8.9% from 18 to 24, 27.0% from 25 to 44, 22.2% from 45 to 64, and 12.6% 65 or older. The median age was 36 years. For every 100 females, there were 82.4 males. For every 100 females age 18 and over, there were 77.3 males.

The median household income was $20,655 and the median family income  was $26,719. Males had a median income of $22,833 versus $20,038 for females. The per capita income for the town was $11,794. About 21.0% of families and 24.4% of the population were below the poverty line, including 34.8% of those under age 18 and 31.5% of those age 65 or over.

2010 census
At the 2010 census there were 1,014 people, 450 households, and 269 families in the town. The racial makeup of the town was 88.4% Black or African American, 10.2% White, 0.5% from other races, and 0.8% from two or more races. .7% of the population were Hispanic or Latino of any race.
Of the 450 households 21.8% had children under the age of 18 living with them, 26.9% were married couples living together, 28.7% had a female householder with no husband present, and 40.2% were non-families. 36.9% of households were one person and 12.0% were one person aged 65 or older. The average household size was 2.25 and the average family size was 2.96.

The age distribution was 22.1% under the age of 18, 10.1% from 18 to 24, 20.7% from 25 to 44, 32.6% from 45 to 64, and 14.5% 65 or older. The median age was 41.8 years. For every 100 females, there were 77.9 males. For every 100 females age 18 and over, there were 81.6 males.

The median household income was $18,663 and the median family income  was $23,646. Males had a median income of $27,083 versus $16,694 for females. The per capita income for the town was $12,627. About 37.2% of families and 38.6% of the population were below the poverty line, including 55.8% of those under age 18 and 31.3% of those age 65 or over.

2020 census

As of the 2020 United States census, there were 1,006 people, 384 households, and 279 families residing in the town.

Notable person
Bill Higdon, former Major League Baseball player

Gallery

Climate
The climate in this area is characterized by hot, humid summers and generally mild to cool winters.  According to the Köppen Climate Classification system, Camp Hill has a humid subtropical climate, abbreviated "Cfa" on climate maps.

References

Towns in Tallapoosa County, Alabama
Towns in Alabama
Alexander City micropolitan area